Zapomnij mi is the debut studio album by Polish singer Sarsa. The album was released on 28 August 2015 through Universal Music Polska. It has peaked at number-two on the Polish albums chart and has been certified platinum.

Singles
"Naucz mnie" was released as the album's lead single on 30 April 2015. The song became a commercial success in Poland, reaching number-one on the airplay and new airplay charts in addition to being certified diamond. It also won Biggest Hit at the 2015 Eska Music Awards.

"Indiana" was released as the second single on 14 August. The song peaked at number-one on the Polish new airplay chart, while it became a top 20 single on the airplay chart. It has since been certified gold. "Zapomnij mi" was released as the third single from the album on 7 December. It reached number-one on the new airplay chart and has become a top ten hit on the airplay chart. The album's fourth and final single, "Feel No Fear", was released on 14 April 2016.

Track listing

Charts and certifications

Weekly charts

Certifications

Release history

References

2015 debut albums
Polish-language albums
Sarsa (singer) albums
Universal Music Group albums